George Scott Robertson was a rugby union footballer from New Zealand. He was a member of the team which toured Australia in 1884 and which is recognised as the first New Zealand national team.

References
 

1857 births
1920 deaths
New Zealand international rugby union players
Rugby union forwards
Rugby union players from Hackney